Guanxi Township or Guansi Township is an urban township in Hsinchu County, Taiwan. The population of the township consists mainly of the Hakkas with a minority of the indigenous Atayal people.

Geography

Administrative divisions
Tungxing, Xian, Nanxiong, Beidou, Beishan, Renan, Nanshan, Tungan, Tungshan, Tungguang, Nanxin, Xinfu, Yushan, Jinshan, Jinshan, Datong, Shiguang, Tungping, Shanglin, Xinli and Nanhe Village.

Economy
The township is known for its production of grass jelly.

Infrastructure
 Hsintao Power Plant is operated by Hsin Tao Power Corporation

Tourist attractions

 Leofoo Village Theme Park  
 Mawudo Exploration Forest
 Taihe Temple
 Dong'an Bridge
 Chaoyin Temple
 Guanxi Catholic Church
 Formosa Black Tea Company
 Lo House
 Niou Lan River Waterfront Park
 Guanxi Old Police Station

Transportation
Guanxi Bus Station is served by Hsinchu Bus. The township is connected to National freeway 3 via the Guanxi Interchange.

References

External links

  

Townships in Hsinchu County